The 2003–04 Wichita Thunder season was the 12th season of the CHL franchise in Wichita, Kansas.

Regular season

Division standings

See also
2003–04 CHL season

Wichita Thunder seasons
Wich